Two Soundtracks for Angela Bulloch is an EP by the American musician David Grubbs which was written to accompany the artwork of Angela Bulloch.

Track listing 
 "Z Point" – 8:14
 "Horizontal Technicolour" – 13:12

References

2005 EPs